Félix Lemaréchal (born 7 August 2003) is a French professional footballer who plays as a midfielder for Ligue 1 club Brest on loan from Monaco.

Club career 
Félix Lemaréchal made his professional debut for Monaco on 16 October 2021, coming on as a substitute in the 2–0 away Ligue 1 loss against Lyon.

On 31 January 2023, Lemaréchal joined Brest on loan until the end of the season with the option to make the move permanent.

International career
Born in France, Lemaréchal is of Ivorian descent. He is a youth international for France.

References

External links

AS Monaco profile

2003 births
Living people
Sportspeople from Tours, France
French footballers
France youth international footballers
French sportspeople of Ivorian descent
Association football midfielders
Tours FC players
FC Girondins de Bordeaux players
AS Monaco FC players
Stade Brestois 29 players
Ligue 1 players
Championnat National 2 players
Footballers from Centre-Val de Loire